The Venezuela blind snake (Trilepida affinis) is a species of snake in the family Leptotyphlopidae.

References

Trilepida
Reptiles described in 1884
Taxobox binomials not recognized by IUCN